Stefano Sposetti (born 22 December 1958) is a Swiss amateur astronomer and a prolific discoverer of minor planets. He lives in Gnosca, in the Italian-speaking part of Switzerland in the Ticino Alps, where the Gnosca Observatory is located.

Sposetti took images of 2004 FH, an Aten asteroid that made a sub-lunar flyby of Earth. In addition, he detects the optical counterparts of gamma-ray bursts and conducts transit photometry on exoplanets at his observatory.

As of 2019, Sposetti's discoveries include 164 minor planets (numbered only). The Minor Planet Center ranks him 70th in the list of all-time, worldwide discoverers. Asteroid 22354 Sposetti has been named after him.

List of discovered minor planets

See also

References

External links 
 143–Gnosca – The astronomical observatory 

21st-century Swiss astronomers
1958 births
Discoverers of asteroids

Living people
20th-century Swiss astronomers